Mohrmann is a surname. Notable people with the surname include:

Christine Mohrmann (1903–1988), Dutch academic
Dieter Möhrmann (born 1948), German politician